Mitochondrial import receptor subunit TOM34 is a protein that in humans is encoded by the TOMM34 gene.

The protein encoded by this gene is involved in the import of precursor proteins into mitochondria. The encoded protein has a chaperone-like activity, binding the mature portion of unfolded proteins and aiding their import into mitochondria. This protein, which is found in the cytoplasm and sometimes associated with the outer mitochondrial membrane, has a weak ATPase activity and contains 6 TPR repeats.

References

Further reading

Co-chaperones